Storms Dressed as Stars is the second album by Melbourne indie band Gersey. It was released in 2002. Two singles were taken from the album — "Look to the Sun" and "For Whom Do You Sail?", which included four tracks from a radio session recorded for California radio station KCRW's "Morning Becomes Electric" show.

Track listing
(all songs by Gersey)
 "Wait Here" — 3:35
 "The Night We Walked to Mexico" — 6:11
 "Baby, You're a Strange Girl" — 5:57
 "Crashing" — 5:09
 "Trouble With Jonah" — 3:26
 "For Whom Do You Sail?" — 2:52
 "Look to the Sun" — 3:59
 "La Zona Rosa" — 3:33
 "Goodbye, Columbus" — 2:23
 "The Last Tango" — 3:12
 "A Day to be Certain" — 6:26

Personnel

 Craig Jackson — bass, vocals
 Daryl Bradie — guitar
 Danny Tulen — drums
 Matt Davis — guitar

Additional musicians

 Peter Hollo — cello ("For Whom Do You Sail?")
 Lara Goodridge — violin ("For Whom Do You Sail?")
 Katie Broadbent — vocals ("Trouble With Jonah", "The Last Tango")

References

2002 albums